Dren, also spelled Drin, is a given name.

It is used as a masculine given name in Albanian culture. The origin of this name comes from the Albanian word dren (Gheg Albanian); dre (Standard Albanian), which means deer. The feminine form is Drenusha (female deer).

The word "Dren" (Дрен) means dogwood or specifically European Cornel (Cornus mas) in Serbian.

People
Dren Abazi (born 1985), Kosovar Albanian singer and songwriter
Dren Hodja (born 1994), Albanian footballer
Dren Mandić, Serbian climber, one of the fatalities of the 2008 K2 disaster.

Fictional characters
Dren, the name of the character Kish in the English adaptation (Mew Mew Power) of the anime series Tokyo Mew Mew
Dren, a human hybrid creature in the 2010 movie Splice

References

Albanian masculine given names
Serbian masculine given names